The Hsinchu City EPB Incinerator Plant is an incinerator in North District, Hsinchu City, Taiwan.

History
The construction plan of the plant was approved by Environmental Protection Administration on 2 September 1991. The architect of the plant was appointed in 1992 and contract for the construction work was signed in April 1994. On 11 April 1995, the construction work began and finished in August 2000. The plant began its operation on 16 February 2001.

Geology
The site was constructed at the Nanliao landfill area with an area of 30 hectares. The area used to be a beach but was transformed into a landfill in 1973 but was eventually closed in November 1994.

Architecture
The plant was designed by architect Ieoh Ming-pei. It occupies a 5.5 hectares of land.

Technical details
The plant can treat 900 tons of garbage per day from Hsinchu City, Miaoli County and Taoyuan City and produce 24 MWh of electricity per day. As of 2020, it received a total of 22,606 tons of garbage annually and incinerated 21,827 tons of them.

See also
 Air pollution in Taiwan
 Waste management in Taiwan

References

External links

 

2001 establishments in Taiwan
Buildings and structures in Hsinchu
Incinerators in Taiwan
Infrastructure completed in 2000